Istropolis may refer to:
Bratislava, capital of Slovakia
Histria (ancient city), ancient city of Lower Moesia, now in Romania